Thomas Smelt (1820 – 1893) was an English first-class cricketer.

Born at Manchester in 1820, Smelt made two appearances in first-class cricket for Manchester, playing against Sheffield at Hyde Park in 1848 and the Marylebone Cricket Club at Lord's in 1852. He was by profession a commissioning agent.

References

External links

1820 births
1893 deaths
Cricketers from Manchester
English cricketers
Manchester Cricket Club cricketers